Miguel Juárez (29 September 1931 – 4 March 1982) was an Argentine footballer. He played in five matches for the Argentina national football team in 1957 and 1958. He was also part of Argentina's squad for the 1957 South American Championship.

References

External links
 

1931 births
1982 deaths
Argentine footballers
Argentina international footballers
Association football forwards
People from Salta
Rosario Central footballers
Sportspeople from Salta Province
Club Atlético Colón managers